Francisco Epigmenio Luna Kan (born 3 December 1925) is a Mexican politician. Francisco Luna Kan was governor of the state of Yucatán from 1976 to 1982.

Born in Mérida, Yucatán, he was a practicing doctor of medicine then taught as a Professor of Medicine before first obtaining political office, at first being overseer of the state's rural medical system.

Francisco Luna Kan was the first person of pure Maya ancestry to govern Yucatán since the Spanish conquest of Yucatán. (In the early 1920s,  Felipe Carrillo Puerto, who was partly Maya, had been governor.) For centuries the political elite had been Criollos (Yucatecans of pure  Spanish ancestry). It was widely said that party officials of Mexico's  ruling Institutional Revolutionary Party (PRI) took the unusual step of selecting a person of Maya descent as their candidate in 1975 because the opposition National Action Party had been getting many votes in Yucatán, and PRI candidates had been getting a poor showing in the state's predominantly Maya towns and villages. It was said that PAN got the majority of votes in the previous governor's race, and the PRI managed to maintain control of the state only through fraud in counting votes.

After his term as governor Luna Kan resigned from the PRI and joined the Party of the Democratic Revolution (PRD). He unsuccessfully ran as that party's candidate for mayor of Mérida in 1998.  Francisco Luna Kan holds a seat in Mexico's Chamber of Deputies of Mexico as a PRD deputy for Yucatán.

References

1925 births
Living people
Governors of Yucatán (state)
Presidents of the Senate of the Republic (Mexico)
Party of the Democratic Revolution politicians
Politicians from Yucatán (state)
People from Mérida, Yucatán
Institutional Revolutionary Party politicians
Mexican people of Maya descent